Stone's Reach is the second studio album by Australian melodic death metal band, Be'lakor, released in 2009.  Stone's Reach won “Best Melodeath/Gothenburg” album in 2009 metalstorm.net awards.   The album was remastered and rereleased for vinyl on 19 December 2014 and digitally 22 December 2014.
In 2014, Stone's Reach was voted "The Best Melodeath / Gothenburg Metal Album" in the Metalstorm.net ten year anniversary awards.

The album was tracked, edited and mixed at PennyDrop Audio in Cheltenham, Melbourne by Warren Hammond.

Track listing

Album cover 
The album's cover art is based on Benvenuto Cellini’s 1545 bronze sculpture of Perseus with the head of Medusa.
The album was laid out and designed by Australian graphic artist, Sheri Tantawy who has also designed artwork for Switchblade, Picture The End, Our Last Enemy, Black Like Vengeance and many other Australian-based artists.

References 

2009 albums
Be'lakor albums